Stephen Dunham (September 14, 1964 – September 14, 2012) was an American actor, best known as Edward Pillows on the series DAG and known internationally for his roles as Isaac Henderson in The Mummy and Dr. Paul Chamberlain in Monster-in-Law.

Personal life
Stephen Dunham was born Stephen Dunham Bowers in Boston, Massachusetts on September 14, 1964. He grew up in Manchester, New Hampshire. He was married to actress Alexondra Lee and was a lifelong Democrat.

Career
Dunham was perhaps best known for his role as Isaac Henderson in the hit 1999 film The Mummy. He had originally auditioned for the role of Rick O'Connell and was unsuccessful, however, director Stephen Sommers liked Dunham's acting enough to cast him as Henderson instead. 
Following this, he played Hunter Franklin on the short-lived sitcom Oh, Grow Up and Agent Edward Pillows in 17 episodes of DAG from 2000 to 2001.

He played the recurring role Peter in season 2 of What I Like About You and was also known for his role as Charlie Thorpe in Hot Properties. He acted in dozens of other television shows and major films. 
He appeared as Dr. Paul Chamberlain Monster-in-Law (2005), The Bill Engvall Show (2007), Chad on True Jackson, VP and had an appearance in Get Smart (2008).

In 2011, he appeared on Hot in Cleveland, playing an Amish bartender, and in 2012, before his death, he played his final role as Doug Nelson in Paranormal Activity 4 alongside his real life wife Alexondra Lee.

Death
He suffered a heart attack and died on September 14, 2012, his 48th birthday, in Burbank, California. The end credits of Paranormal Activity 4 include a dedication to him.

Filmography

Film

Television

References

External links

1964 births
2012 deaths
Male actors from New Hampshire
Male actors from Boston
American male film actors
American male television actors
Actors from Manchester, New Hampshire